Iceland competed at the 1994 Winter Olympics in Lillehammer, Norway.

Competitors
The following is the list of number of competitors in the Games.

Alpine skiing

Men

Women

Cross-country skiing

Men

See also
 Iceland at the 1994 Winter Paralympics

References

Official Olympic Reports

Nations at the 1994 Winter Olympics
1994
Winter Olympics